Chanthaburi Football Club  is a Thai professional football club based in Chanthaburi Province. The club is currently playing in the Thai League 3 Eastern region.

History

The club was formed in 2004. By the year 2006 is not clear in which league the club played. In the statistics there are also a team from Chanthaburi, has reached the 1984 final of the Cup. does not clarify whether this is the same club. The 2006 season but the club played in the Thailand Provincial League and won the 8th place. The Provincial League, which was run by the Sports Federation Thailand, left the club for the 2007 season and moved to the Thailand Division 1 League. This league is under the Thai Football Association. Place in the 2007 season could confirm the placement in 2008 with nearly a fifth place. With 13 points behind, however, nothing to do with the rise.

In consecutive seasons in 2009 Thai Division 1 League and 2010 Thai Division 1 League, Chantaburi finished only 2 points and one place above the drop zone to avoid relegation to Regional League Division 2.

Samut Songkram's former coach, Somchai Chuayboonchum, will take charge of Chantaburi for the 2011 campaign. He has brought several of his ex-players from Samut Songkhram to the Hares.

Honours

Domestic leagues
 Thai League 4 Eastern Region
 Winners (1): 2017
Thailand FA Cup
Runners-up (1): 1984

Stadium and locations

Season by season record

P = Played
W = Games won
D = Games drawn
L = Games lost
F = Goals for
A = Goals against
Pts = Points
Pos = Final position

QR1 = First Qualifying Round
QR2 = Second Qualifying Round
R1 = Round 1
R2 = Round 2
R3 = Round 3
R4 = Round 4

R5 = Round 5
R6 = Round 6
QF = Quarter-finals
SF = Semi-finals
RU = Runners-up
W = Winners

Players

Current squad

Management and support staff

References

External links
 Official Website
 Official Facebookpage

Football clubs in Thailand
Chanthaburi province
Association football clubs established in 2004
2004 establishments in Thailand